Carl Erik Carpentier (17 August 1897 – 17 February 1978) was a Swedish gymnast and track and field athlete. He was part of the Swedish gymnastics team that won the gold medal in the Swedish system event at the 1920 Summer Olympics. Nationally he also competed in the high jump and decathlon.

References

External links 
 

1897 births
1978 deaths
Swedish male artistic gymnasts
Swedish male high jumpers
Gymnasts at the 1920 Summer Olympics
Olympic gymnasts of Sweden
Olympic gold medalists for Sweden
Olympic medalists in gymnastics
Medalists at the 1920 Summer Olympics
People from Sölvesborg Municipality
Sportspeople from Blekinge County
19th-century Swedish people
20th-century Swedish people